Couratari pyramidata is a species of flowering plant in the family Lecythidaceae. It is endemic to Brazil, where it is limited to the region around Rio de Janeiro.

References

pyramidata
Endemic flora of Brazil
Endangered plants
Taxonomy articles created by Polbot